Andrae Williams (born 12 July 1983 in Freeport, Bahamas) is a Bahamian sprint athlete mainly competing in the 400m.

University

Williams competed in collegiate track at Texas Tech University.

2004
In the 2004 Olympic Games, Williams was a member of the Bahamian 4 x 400 metres relay team that finished 6th.

2005

In June 2005, Williams set a new personal best of 44.90 in the 400 metres.

At the 2005 World Championships, Williams and the Bahamas won silver in 4 X 400 m relay behind the United States.

2007

At the 2007 World Championships, Williams (together with Avard Moncur, Chris Brown and Michael Mathieu) won silver in the 4 × 400 m relay in 2.59.18s.

References

External links

Texas Tech Profile

1983 births
Living people
Bahamian male sprinters
Athletes (track and field) at the 2004 Summer Olympics
Athletes (track and field) at the 2008 Summer Olympics
Athletes (track and field) at the 2007 Pan American Games
Olympic athletes of the Bahamas
Olympic silver medalists for the Bahamas
Texas Tech Red Raiders men's track and field athletes
World Athletics Championships medalists
Texas Tech University alumni
Medalists at the 2012 Summer Olympics
Medalists at the 2008 Summer Olympics
People from Freeport, Bahamas
Pan American Games gold medalists for the Bahamas
Olympic silver medalists in athletics (track and field)
Pan American Games medalists in athletics (track and field)
Medalists at the 2007 Pan American Games